Fifth Amendment may refer to:
 Fifth Amendment to the United States Constitution, part of the Bill of Rights, which protects against the abuse of government authority in legal proceedings
 Fifth Amendment of the Constitution of Ireland, a referendum related to the Roman Catholic Church and other religious denominations
 Australian referendum, 1967 (Aboriginals), the fifth amendment to the Constitution of Australia, regarding the constitutional position of Indigenous Australians
 Fifth Amendment of the Constitution of South Africa, which made technical changes relating to the election of the National Assembly and the structure of the Financial and Fiscal Commission
 Fifth Amendment to the Constitution of Pakistan
Fifth Amendment, album by The Vibrators